Eurymorpha cyanipes is a species of beetles in the family Cicindelidae, the only species in the genus Eurymorpha.

References

Cicindelidae
Monotypic Adephaga genera